Bachrach Studios is an American photographic studio, believed to be one of the oldest continuously operating photography studios in the world.

History
It was founded in Baltimore in 1868 by David Bachrach, Jr.

The studio's founder, David Bachrach, took the only photo of Abraham Lincoln's Gettysburg Address. The studio has photographed every US Head of State since then, its founder having made it a goal to photograph all the important people he could. He sought and received permission to photograph such notables as Charles Lindbergh and Calvin Coolidge. The studio went on to produce portraits of Albert Einstein, Thomas Edison, Henry Ford, Eleanor Roosevelt, Douglas Dobson, and Muhammad Ali, among others.

In 1919 the company hired Paul Gittings, who opened and managed Bachrach Studios in Texas.  Bachrach Studio had forty-eight locations throughout the United States at its height in 1929. During the Great Depression, Bachrach scaled down the company and sold the Texas studios to Gittings.

Bachrach Studios remains a family business as of 2010.

See also
Louis Fabian Bachrach, Jr.

References

Further reading
 The Bolivian Times (weekly newspaper), June 18, 1998
 History of Bachrach Studios

External links

Photographic studios
19th-century American photographers
Companies based in Baltimore
History of Baltimore
American companies established in 1868
Publishing companies established in 1868
1868 establishments in Maryland
Photography companies of the United States